Máximo Soto Hall was an early 20th century Guatemalan novelist. He is most known for his 1899 novel El problema, though he is recognized in Central America for the whole of his literary output. He was born in Guatemala City in 1871, and served in the dictatorship of Manuel Estrada (whose government served as a model for Miguel Ángel Asturias' novel El Señor Presidente) until 1919, at which time he emigrated to Costa Rica, and then to Buenos Aires, Argentina, where he served as a journalist for the newspaper La Prensa. He died in 1944 in Buenos Aires and his body is interred in the San Lázaro cemetery in Antigua Guatemala. Many of his novels, including El problema and La sombra de la Casa Blanca, concern the presence and influence of the United States in Central America. La sombra was published by El Ateneo in Buenos Aires. His works traverse a great number of literary traditions, including Modernismo and the historical novel, the latter influenced by his fellow countryman José Milla. He also wrote poetry, as well as political treatises and sociological works.

Partial bibliography

 El ideal, 1894
 El problema, 1899
 Catalina, 1900
 Herodías, 1927
 La sombra de la Casa Blanca, 1927
 Don Diego Portales, 1935
 La divina reclusa, 1938

Sources

 Albizúrez Palma, Francisco and Catalina Barrios y Barrios. Historia de la literatura guatemalteca, tomo 2. 
Guatemala: Editorial Universitaria, 1982.

References

1871 births
1944 deaths
People from Guatemala City
Guatemalan novelists
Guatemalan male writers
Male novelists